Surrender to Love is the debut studio album by American neo soul group Kindred the Family Soul, released February 25, 2003 via Hidden Beach Recordings. It peaked at #159 on the Billboard 200 and #29 on the Billboard R&B chart. The album's only official single was "Far Away", which peaked at #53 on the Billboard R&B singles chart.

Track listing

Chart positions

Samples

References

External links
 
 

2003 debut albums
Kindred the Family Soul albums
Hidden Beach Recordings albums